Deconstruction: The Celluloid Recordings is a compilation album by American composer Bill Laswell, released on January 19, 1993 by Restless Records. It comprises solo recordings alongside his work with artists such as Material, Massacre, Time Zone, Fab Five Freddy, Tour‚ Kunda, the Last Poets, Manu Dibango and Fela Kuti.

Track listing

Personnel 
Bill Laswell – bass guitar
Robert Soares – compiling

Release history

References

External links 
 

1993 compilation albums
Bill Laswell compilation albums
Albums produced by Bill Laswell
Restless Records compilation albums